The freckled sea catfish (Notarius lentiginosus) is a species of catfish in the family Ariidae. It was described by Carl H. Eigenmann and Rosa Smith Eigenmann, in 1888, originally under the genus Tachisurus. It inhabits marine waters in Panama.

References

Ariidae
Fish described in 1888